Pollock or pollack (pronounced ) is the common name used for either of the two species of North Atlantic marine fish in the genus Pollachius. Pollachius pollachius is referred to as pollock in North America, Ireland and the United Kingdom, while Pollachius virens is usually known as saithe or coley in Great Britain and Ireland (derived from the older name coalfish). Other names for P. pollachius include the Atlantic pollock, European pollock, lieu jaune, and lythe; while P. virens is also known as Boston blue (distinct from bluefish), silver bill, or saithe.

Species 
The recognized species in this genus are:
 Pollachius pollachius (Linnaeus, 1758) (pollack)
 Pollachius virens (Linnaeus, 1758) (coalfish)

Description 
P. virens has a strongly defined, silvery lateral line running down the sides. Above the lateral line, the colour is a greenish black. The belly is white, while P. pollachius has a distinctly crooked lateral line, grayish to golden belly, and a dark brown back. P. pollachius also has a strong underbite. Pollock is a whitefish.

As food 

Atlantic pollock is largely considered to be a whitefish. Traditionally a popular source of food in some countries, such as Norway, in the United Kingdom it has previously been largely consumed as a cheaper and versatile alternative to cod and haddock. However, in recent years, pollock has become more popular due to overfishing of cod and haddock. It can now be found in most supermarkets as fresh fillets or prepared freezer items. For example, it is used minced in fish fingers or as an ingredient in imitation crab meat and is commonly used to make fish and chips.

In 2009, UK supermarket Sainsbury's briefly renamed Atlantic pollock "colin" in a bid to boost ecofriendly sales of the fish as an alternative to cod. Sainsbury's, which said the new name was derived from the French for cooked pollock (colin), launched the product under the banner "Colin and chips can save British cod."

Other fish called pollock 

One member of the genus Gadus is also commonly referred to as pollock: the Alaska pollock or walleye pollock (Gadus chalcogrammus), including the form known as the Norway pollock. They are also members of the family Gadidae but not members of the genus Pollachius.

References

Further reading 

Davidson, Alan. Oxford Companion to Food (1999), “Saithe”, p. 682. 
Norum, Ben. The Big Book of Ben (2007), "pollock / pollack", p. 32

External links 
 
 

 
Gadidae
Commercial fish
Taxa named by Sven Nilsson